Raj Bhavan is a legislative assembly constituency in the Union territory of Puducherry in India. Raj Bhavan assembly constituency is a part of Puducherry (Lok Sabha constituency).

Members of the Legislative Assembly

Election Result

2021 election

References 

 

Assembly constituencies of Puducherry